Cyborg: The Second Book of the Clone Codes is a 2011 book by Patricia and Fredrick McKissack. It is the second book in the Clone Codes trilogy and is about Houston Ye, a teen cyborg who, with Leanna (a girl who discovered she is a clone in the first book, The Clone Codes), attempt to obtain civil rights for themselves.

Reception
A review in the School Library Journal wrote "It's a fast-paced book, sometimes too much so. There is little character development, and the plot takes sudden jumps that makes it difficult to follow." Other reviews were critical, with Library Media Connection writing "Way too much telling, not enough showing.", and Voice of Youth Advocates finding it "didactic and lackluster."

Cyborg has also been reviewed by Kirkus Reviews.

References

2011 children's books
2011 American novels
American children's novels
American science fiction novels
Children's science fiction novels
2011 science fiction novels
Novels set in the 22nd century
Novels about slavery
Novels about virtual reality
Books by Patricia McKissack
Scholastic Corporation books